Greta Cvetanova Panova (born 1983 in Sofia, Bulgaria) is a Bulgarian-American mathematician. She is a professor of mathematics at the University of Southern California in Los Angeles.  Her research interests include combinatorics, probability and theoretical computer science.

Education and career
Panova received her B.S. in 2005 from MIT. She received M.A. in 2006 from University of California, Berkeley and Ph.D. in mathematics from Harvard University in 2011, under the supervision of Richard Stanley.  She was then a postdoc at UCLA (2011-2014), Assistant and Associate Professor at the University of Pennsylvania (2014-2018), and is currently a tenured Associate Professor at the University of Southern California. She was also Visiting Scholar at the Simons Institute for the Theory of Computing (Fall 2018).

Panova has published over 40 papers primarily in algebraic combinatorics with applications to geometric complexity theory, probability and statistical mechanics.  She is currently a co-Editor-in-Chief of the Electronic Journal of Combinatorics.

Selected awards
Panova was a three time medalist at the International Mathematical Olympiad (1999-2001, one gold and two silver medals).  She was a third prize winner at the William Lowell Putnam Mathematical Competition (2001), and a winner of the Best Student Paper Award at the Formal Power Series and Algebraic Combinatorics Conference (FPSAC, 2011).  She is a recipient of Katz Fellowship (UC Berkeley), Putnam Fellowship (Harvard), James Mills Peirce Fellowship (Harvard), Simons Postdoctoral Fellowship (UCLA), and von Neumann Fellowship (IAS). Panova was also an invited plenary speaker at FPSAC 2017 in London. 
Panova is the recipient of the Institute of Mathematics and Informatics IMI Award for 2020 given once every three years to a Bulgarian citizen under the age of 40 for high achievements in the field of mathematics.

References

External links
 

1983 births
Living people
Scientists from Sofia
Bulgarian emigrants to the United States
Harvard University alumni
University of California, Berkeley alumni
Massachusetts Institute of Technology alumni
University of Southern California faculty
University of Pennsylvania faculty
Institute for Advanced Study visiting scholars
21st-century American mathematicians
American women mathematicians
Bulgarian women mathematicians
Bulgarian mathematicians
Combinatorialists
Probability theorists
Theoretical computer scientists
21st-century American women